James Briggs (8 April 1937 – 9 April 2011) was a Scottish professional footballer who played as a full back. Briggs played the majority of his career with Dundee United, making nearly 400 appearances and captaining the side when they defeated Barcelona in their first European campaign in the 1960s. He then briefly played for Montrose, followed by three seasons in the Highland League with Keith.

Briggs was named in 2008 as one of the inaugural inductees to the Dundee United Hall of Fame. He died on 9 April 2011.

References

1937 births
2011 deaths
Footballers from Dundee
Scottish footballers
Scottish expatriate footballers
Scottish Football League players
United Soccer Association players
Dundee United F.C. players
Dallas Tornado players
Montrose F.C. players
Association football fullbacks
Keith F.C. players
Expatriate soccer players in the United States
Highland Football League players
Scottish expatriate sportspeople in the United States